David James George Hennessy, 3rd Baron Windlesham and Baron Hennessy,  (28 January 1932 – 21 December 2010), was a Conservative Party politician in the United Kingdom who held visiting professorships at various universities.

Early life
Hennessy, an Anglo-Irish peer, was educated at Ampleforth College and Trinity College, Oxford, earning a Master of Arts in Jurisprudence in 1957. He did his National Service with the Grenadier Guards in Tripoli.
His father, James Hennessy, 2nd Baron Windlesham, was a Lieutenant General in the Grenadier Guards. They are closely related to the Franco-Irish Cognac Hennessy family.

Political career
Hennessy was elected to Westminster Borough Council in 1958 to 1962, unsuccessfully contested Tottenham in 1959, and entered the House of Lords as the 3rd Baron Windlesham upon his father's death in 1962, who died in a helicopter accident at sea, having been a brigadier in the Grenadier Guards. He joined the Government as Minister of State in the Home Office in 1970 to 1972; and from 1972 to 1973, in the Northern Ireland Office, after which he became Lord Keeper of the Privy Seal and Leader of the House of Lords in June 1973 until October 1974. He was appointed a Commander of the Royal Victorian Order (CVO) in the 1981 New Year's Honours. On 16 November 1999, he was created Baron Hennessy, of Windlesham in the County of Surrey after the House of Lords Act 1999, so that he could continue sitting in the Lords.

Media
He worked for Associated-Rediffusion and was involved in This Week. He later joined the board of Rediffusion as Chief Programme Executive. His TV career continued as managing director of Grampian (1967–1970) and managing director of the ATV network (1974–1981). He was a director of The Observer from 1981 to 1989.

Academic
Hennessy returned to Oxford, where he earned a DLitt, and was principal of Brasenose College from 1989 to 2002. He had also been a visiting professor at Princeton University in 1997 and 2002 to 2003.

Family
Baron Windlesham married the fashion journalist and author Prudence Glynn in 1965. She died in 1986; he is survived by a son, James and a daughter, Victoria.

Arms

References

External links
 Announcement of his taking the oath under his new title at the House of Lords House of Lords minutes of proceedings, 22 November 1999
 David James George Hennessy, 3rd Baron Windlesham, National Portrait Gallery

1932 births
2010 deaths
Alumni of Trinity College, Oxford
Lords Privy Seal
Barons Windlesham
Conservative Party (UK) councillors
Conservative Party (UK) life peers
Commanders of the Royal Victorian Order
Leaders of the House of Lords
Members of the Bow Group
Members of the Privy Council of the United Kingdom
People educated at Ampleforth College
Principals of Brasenose College, Oxford
British Roman Catholics
British people of Irish descent
Northern Ireland Office junior ministers
Eldest sons of British hereditary barons
Hennessy family
Honorary Fellows of the British Academy
Hennessy
Life peers created by Elizabeth II
Windlesham